In the context of research and development (R&D) collaborations, background, foreground, sideground and postground intellectual property (IP) are four distinct forms of intellectual property assets. These are included in the broader and more general categories of knowledge in R&D collaborations or open innovation. While background and foreground IP and knowledge are fairly established concepts, sideground and postground IP and knowledge have more recently been added to the conceptual vocabulary. This set of four concepts was first introduced by Prof. Ove Granstrand in a European Commission report in 2001.

The four knowledge/IP types are defined by Granstrand and Holgersson (2014):

Background knowledge/IP is knowledge/IP that is relevant to a collaborative venture or open innovation project that is supplied by the partners at the start of the project.
Foreground knowledge/IP is all the knowledge/IP produced within the collaborative venture or  open innovation project during the project’s tenure.
Sideground knowledge/IP is knowledge/IP that is relevant to a collaborative venture or open innovation project, but produced outside the project by any of the partners during the project’s tenure.
Postground knowledge/IP is knowledge/IP that is relevant to a collaborative venture or open innovation project that is produced by any of the partners after the project ends.

References

Further reading

Intellectual property law
Economics of intellectual property
Research and development